"I'm N Luv (Wit a Stripper)" (censored as "I'm N Luv (Wit a Dancer)") is a single written and performed by American rapper and singer T-Pain featuring fellow American rapper Mike Jones. Produced by the former, it was released in late 2005 and peaked at number five on the Billboard Hot 100 chart, making it T-Pain's second top 10 single, and Mike Jones's first. This is T-Pain's third most successful single to date, tying with his other "Bartender", and Mike Jones's most successful single to date. The official remix is with Twista, Pimp C, R. Kelly, Too Short and more.

Details

The song centers around a man who goes to a strip club and wants to take a certain girl over to his place to spend the night. A censored version was made, called "I'm N Luv (Wit a Dancer)", to eliminate the sexual references. Some radio stations play the censored version, some the original, but with profanities removed, but most radio stations prefer to not play the song at all.  The original version of the music video appeared on MTV but was quickly removed due to strong sexual content. A new music video was made without sexual content.

T-Pain produced the song using Apple's GarageBand music software in about two hours. It utilizes a steel string acoustic guitar, hip hop drum machine, and a chiptune synthesizer known as "Future Flute", all from the software.

Charts

Weekly charts

Year-end charts

Certifications

Official versions
 "I'm N Luv (Wit a Stripper)" (Album Version) - 4:25
 "I'm N Luv (Wit a Stripper)" (Radio/Video Edit w. Rap) - 4:00
 "I'm N Luv (Wit a Stripper)" (No Rap Version) - 3:46
 "I'm N Luv (Wit a Stripper)" (Clean Version) - 3:47
 "I'm N Luv (Wit a Stripper) 2" (Tha Remix) - 6:03
 "I'm N Luv (Wit a Stripper)"

Remixes and parodies
A remix had been made featuring Twista, Akon, Pimp C, Paul Wall, R. Kelly, MJG and Too Short titled "I'm N Luv (Wit a Stripper) 2 - Tha Remix". A video was also released for this remix, which is on iTunes.

An additional remix with the various artists includes verses by Busta Rhymes and Pitbull. Moreover, in the iTunes' Triple Play single, it includes a reggaeton remix.

Another remix features Keak da Sneak titled "I'm 'n Luv wit a Ripper".

The song is parodied by "Weird Al" Yankovic with "I'm 'n Luv wit the Skipper" during his Straight Outta Lynwood Tour. A Lighter Shade of Brown made a parody of the song called "I'm N Luv (Wit your Sister)."

Jeremy Jordan and Jonathan Groff sang this song in the movie Joyful Noise.

References

2005 songs
2006 singles
Mike Jones (rapper) songs
T-Pain songs
Song recordings produced by T-Pain
Songs written by T-Pain
Songs written by Mike Jones (rapper)
Konvict Muzik singles